The Norton Museum of Art is an art museum located in West Palm Beach, Florida. Its collection includes over 8,200 works, with a concentration in European, American, and Chinese art as well as in contemporary art and photography. In 2003, it overtook the John and Mable Ringling Museum of Art, in Sarasota, and became the largest museum in Florida.

History
The Norton Museum of Art was founded in 1941 by Ralph Hubbard Norton (1875–1953) and his first wife, Elizabeth Calhoun Norton (1881–1947).

Norton, the former head of the Chicago-based Acme Steel Co., moved to West Palm Beach upon retirement and decided to share his sizable collection of paintings and sculpture. The late Art Deco/Neoclassical building designed by Marion Sims Wyeth opened its doors to the public on February 8, 1941. Its mission statement is "to preserve for the future the beautiful things of the past."

Under the leadership of its director Hope Alswang from 2010 until 2019, the Norton Museum of Art raised $100 million, which it put toward a plan called the “New Norton.” That initiative involved adding 35 percent more gallery space to the museum, as well as a new auditorium and dining area.

Building
Constructed over two years, it was opened to the public in 2003. The expansion created more space to display art in both the new and existing areas, increasing the Norton's gallery space by 75 percent, allowing more opportunities for the museum's permanent collection. The wing includes 14 new galleries, an enclosed courtyard to accommodate a variety of educational and social events, a glass ceiling installation commissioned from Dale Chihuly, a cantilevered spiral staircase, and three-story atrium designed to evoke the museum's art. The J. Ira and Nicki Harris Family Pavilion is a wedge-shaped meeting and reception space off to one side. The new wing was designed by Chad Floyd of the Connecticut-based Centerbrook Architects & Planners.

In 2013, the museum unveiled a $60 million master plan designed by the British architect Norman Foster that would nearly double its gallery space and add an education center, auditorium and restaurant. The new West Wing added a 43 ft-high Great Hall. A parking lot next to the museum was converted into a  sculpture garden. A new entrance and forecourt along the main thoroughfare, South Dixie Highway, re-established the axial layout of the Norton's original 1941 Art Deco building. As planned, the museum broke ground in 2016.

The museum closed in July, 2018, for renovations. On February 9, 2019, it re-opened, adding  of gallery space, new classrooms, a restaurant, and a 210-seat auditorium, in addition to the sculpture garden.

Norton Museum closed for eight months in 2020, and reopened in November 2020 with new exhibits and safety precautions.

Collection
The ground-level galleries showcase contemporary American art. The top floor is given over to European art through 1870.

In early 2018, the Norton Museum of Art received a gift of more than 100 works from the collection of Howard and Judie Ganek, including artworks by Damien Hirst, Anselm Kiefer, Sigmar Polke, Ed Ruscha, Kara Walker, Donald Judd, Matthew Barney, Nan Goldin, Cindy Sherman, Lorna Simpson, and Pipilotti Rist, among others.

Rudin Prize for Emerging Photography
In 2012, the Norton Museum of Art launched the Rudin Prize for Emerging Photographers, which comes with a $20,000 prize. It was an initiated by Beth Rudin DeWoody and is given biennially to an emerging photographer who has never had a museum show.

2012

The inaugural Rudin Prize was awarded to Analia Saban, nominated by John Baldessari. The other nominees were:

 Eunice Adorno, nominated by Susan Meiselas
 Mauro D’Agati, nominated by Michal Rovner
 Gabriela Nin Solis, nominated by Graciela Iturbide
 Bjørn Venø, nominated by Yinka Shonibare

2014

The second Rudin Prize was awarded to Rami Maymon, nominated by Adi Nes. The other nominees were:

 Miriam Böhm, nominated by Thomas Demand
 Delphine Fawundu, nominated by Deborah Willis
 Renato Osoy, nominated by Luis González Palma

2016

The third Rudin Prize was awarded to Elizabeth Bick, nominated by Shirin Neshat. The other nominees were:

 Clare Benson, nominated by Arno Rafael Minkkinen
 Wesley Stringer, nominated by Michael Kenna
 Alexandra Hunts, nominated by Rineke Dijkstra

2020

The nominees are:

 David Spero, nominated by Ori Gersht
 Kristin-Lee Moolman, nominated by Cindy Sherman
 Jess T. Duggan, nominated by Dawoud Bey
 Lina Hashim, nominated by Trine Søndergaard

Management
 1990–2009: Christina Orr-Cahall 
 2010–2019: Hope Alswang
 2019–2020: Elliot Bostwick Davis
 2021- : Ghislain d'Humières

Notes

External links

Official website

Art museums and galleries in Florida
Museums in West Palm Beach, Florida
Art museums established in 1941
1941 establishments in Florida
Museums of American art